Nigel Greenwood may refer to:

 Nigel Greenwood (footballer) (born 1966), former professional footballer
 Nigel Greenwood (art dealer) (1941–2004), British art dealer
 Nigel Greenwood (admiral), Royal Canadian Navy officer